This is a list of places named Bristol, which includes items such as population centres, islands and geographical features. There are thirty-five populated places in the world named Bristol, the vast majority of which are in the United States. There are also two in Canada and one each in the United Kingdom, Peru, Costa Rica and Jamaica. Bristol is the fifth most commonly re-used British place name, behind Richmond which has 55 namesakes, London which has 46, Oxford with 41 and Manchester which shares its name with 36 other places.

By far the largest Bristol is Bristol, England, with a population of 441,300 within the city boundaries in 2010, followed by Bristol, Connecticut, which had 60,477 people living there at the time of the 2010 census. Bristol Wells Town Site is a ghost town, and therefore has nobody living there.

The English Bristol played a major part in the discovery and settlement of the United States, it being the port from where John Cabot sailed on his 1497 voyage which is commonly credited as the first from Europe to North America, although there is evidence that he was not the first European to sail there. The city was a major port at the time North America was being colonised, resulting in many of the American and Canadian towns of the same name being named after it.

There are two US states that have more than one place called Bristol in them; Pennsylvania, which has a borough and a township with that name, and Wisconsin, which has two towns. All Bristols are in the Western Hemisphere, and most are also in the Northern Hemisphere. The only populated place in the Southern Hemisphere is Bristol, Peru.

Population centres

Other places

Sources

References

Bristol
Places
Bristol
Bristol